Chipman House may refer to:

Edith Chipman House, Vermont, Illinois
Chipman House (Falmouth, Kentucky), listed on the National Register of Historic Places
Exercise Conant House, also known as the Reverend John Chipman House, Beverly, Massachusetts
Delbert and Ora Chipman House, American Fork, Utah
Henry & Elizabeth Parker Chipman House, American Fork, Utah